Unearth is an American metalcore band from Boston, Massachusetts. Formed in 1998, the group has released seven studio albums.

History

Formation and The Stings of Conscience (1998–2002)
Unearth was formed by Trevor Phipps, Buz McGrath, Ken Susi, Mike Rudberg, and Chris Rybicki in Boston, Massachusetts in 1998. The band began as Point 04 (containing McGrath, Rudberg, and Rybicki), and Susi was recruited soon afterwards. The band attempted to recruit Phipps while he recovered from appendicitis, but Phipps was reluctant to join. However, when Phipps showed up to a jam session for one of Susi's side bands, Unearth was practicing instead, and Phipps agreed to join after hearing the song "Shattered by the Sun." The name "Unearth" was coined by drummer Mike Rudberg as he wanted the band to "Unearth" a new sound in the metal and hardcore world. Quickly gaining traction in Boston alongside Overcast,Shadows Fall, and other popular Boston NWOAHM bands and given high praise in independent 'Zines, They went on a short Northeast US Tour with Since the Fall and other Metalcore pioneers Arranged By Steve Cossman. Buzz McGrath especially adding to their Energetic Live show with incredible vertical air jumps with their new 7 Strings, also new to the Hardcore Scene. 

On the small independent label, Endless Fight Records, they released their first EP called Above the Fall of Man in May 1999. Unearth then signed to Eulogy Recordings to release The Stings of Conscience in 2001 and the Endless EP in 2002. During the process of Endless, Chris Rybicki left the group and was first replaced by former Poison the Well bassist Andrew Abramowitz. After Abramowitz left, John Maggard came in.

The Oncoming Storm (2003–2005)
After playing tours and festivals like the New England Metal and Hardcore Festival with Unearth, Mike Rudberg departed from the group days after their performance at The SXSW in 2003, having performed the show in the nude. Also Buz McGrath left for personal problems but came back shortly after. The rest of Unearth would then use Tim Mycek of Sworn Enemy as temporary replacement drummer and Kia Eshghi of Rumi on guitar. Before Buz returned, Mike Martin from All That Remains also filled in for him. After Buz's return, Adam D from Killswitch Engage also filled in on drums for the last two months of the year. In late 2003, They would later begin touring with Killswitch Engage, Shadows Fall, and Lamb of God for MTV's Headbangers Ball United States tour. In the Spring of 2004 Unearth was one of the opening bands on the second MTV Headbangers ball tour, they played alongside groups like Hatebreed, Damageplan & Drowning Pool.

With Buz McGrath and new permanent drummer Mike Justian, of The Red Chord and previously post-hardcore band Hassan I Sabbah, Unearth released The Oncoming Storm through Metal Blade Records on June 29, 2004. That summer, they played at Ozzfest on the second stage. 
Unearth then went on tour once again in the Fall of 2004, this time as a headliner. Terror, The Black Dahlia Murder & Remembering Never all supported the band on that tour. 
In 2005, Unearth performed in the first ever Sounds of the Underground tour with numerous bands like Norma Jean, Gwar, and All That Remains. 
They would also tour with Slipknot & As I Lay Dying in late 2005 in the United States.

III: In the Eyes of Fire (2006–2008)

In early 2006, they began writing their next album. After the writing process, they recorded III: In the Eyes of Fire with well-known heavy metal producer Terry Date at Seattle. This latest coup was yet another landmark in their blossoming career, a fact the band were quick to acknowledge:  "Working with Terry Date is another amazing feat for us on a growing list of accomplishments". As they finished their latest album, they performed at Ozzfest for the second time, including songs from the album even though it was not destined for release until August 8, 2006. During the release, they began their headlined Sanctity of Brothers tour with Bleeding Through, Animosity, Through the Eyes of the Dead and Terror. After participating in Japan's Loud Park festival, Unearth and Slayer toured together all around the U.S. in early 2007 on the Christ Illusion tour. They headlined a European tour in the beginning of 2007 with Job for a Cowboy, Despised Icon, and DÅÅTH.  Which was followed by a U.S. & Canadian tour with Dimmu Borgir, DevilDriver and Kataklysm that began in the middle of April. It was during this tour that drummer Mike Justian was fired from the band for numerous reasons.  To fill in for the rest of the tour, Gene Hoglan of Strapping Young Lad was recruited. They played in the 2007 Download Festival with Seemless/Kingdom of Sorrow/studio drummer Derek Kerswill who has since joined the band officially.

The band's live DVD Alive from the Apocalypse was released on March 18, 2008, and debuted at No. 13 on the Billboard Top Music Video Chart, with sales around 1,800. It was also certified gold in Canada a week after its release.

The March (2008–2010)

On October 14, 2008, Unearth released their fourth album, entitled The March. The album features a re-recorded version of the song "The Chosen", which they contributed to the album Aqua Teen Hunger Force Colon Movie Film for Theaters Colon the Soundtrack. The band recently completed a tour with Gwen Stacy, The Acacia Strain, Whitechapel and Protest the Hero. They have completed the Never Say Die Club Tour with Parkway Drive, Architects, Despised Icon, Protest the Hero, Whitechapel and Carnifex. They have also completed the Metal Hammer Defenders of the Faith tour with other acts such as Lamb of God, Dimmu Borgir and Five Finger Death Punch

As of early 2009, it has been confirmed that The March has sold more than 100,000 copies worldwide. In March 2010, Unearth confirmed that they will be playing the Download Festival opening the festival on the Maurice Jones Stage (formerly known as Main Stage) along with Killswitch Engage, 36 Crazyfists and Them Crooked Vultures.

On September 20, 2010 it was announced that former bassist, Chris Rybicki was killed in a car accident caused by an intoxicated woman. He was 39 years old.

On October 25, 2010, Unearth issued a statement saying they and Derek Kerswill had amicably parted ways.  The band stated there is no bad blood towards Kerswill, and that the situation is purely based on musical differences.  Justin Foley will fill in for drums for their new album.

Unearth completed a North American tour with As I Lay Dying, All That Remains and Carnifex and headed to Europe for the 10-day "Persistence Tour" in December 2010.

Darkness in the Light (2011–2013)
In January 2011 the band entered the studio to work on their fifth studio album entitled Darkness in the Light, which was later released on July 5, 2011. The album was produced by Adam Dutkiewicz and drums were tracked by Justin Foley. On the Metal Injection LiveCast on Wednesday, April 13 Buz McGrath was the special guest. He discussed the new album and mentioned a possible release date. He mentioned that it was vocalist's Trevor Phipps best effort on all the Unearth albums.

On January 31, 2011, the band was announced to be a part of the 2011 Mayhem Festival on the Jägermeister stage. Among the other bands billed for this tour were Disturbed, Godsmack, Megadeth, In Flames, Trivium, Suicide Silence, All Shall Perish, Kingdom of Sorrow Red Fang and Machine Head.

In 2013, Unearth was a part of the Brothers of Brutality tour headlined by Whitechapel and Emmure. John did not perform this tour due to personal matters. Former Poison the Well bassist Iano Dovi and Chimaira guitarist Matt DeVries took over until his return.

Watchers of Rule and departure of John Maggard (2014–2016)

During fall 2014, Unearth released two tracks from their new album Watchers of Rule, which was later released on October 28, 2014 via eOne Music and features 11 tracks on the regular edition and 13 tracks on the deluxe version.

In an interview with Noisefull, lead guitarist Buz McGrath revealed that the band currently has an open bass player position, confirming that John 'Slo' Maggard (who had been missing from touring for the last two years and did not contribute to Watchers of Rule) is no longer in the band.  DeVries, who had performed live bass on all but one tour since the start of 2013, also chose to end his association with the band (and indeed stepped out of music altogether) at year's end, with Chris O'Toole being selected as a live fill-in afterward.

Unearth headlined the fury tour which featured acts like Fit For an Autopsy, Reflections, Great American Ghost, Ringworm and Culture Killer.

The band then supported Soilwork on their Fury Tour alongside Battlecross, Darkness Divided and Wovenwar.

In 2017, Unearth did a small Spring headliner with Fit for an Autopsy, exalt and Darkness Divided.

Extinction(s) (2018–2022)
In March 2018, Unearth announced that they would be playing the final touring portion of the Vans Warped Tour. They would be joined by bands like Every Time I Die, Motionless in White, Wage War, Chelsea Grin, Simple Plan, The Amity Affliction, Harm's Way and much more.

The first single off their newest album, Incinerate premiered on July 2, 2018. The album Extinction(s) was released on November 23.

In support of the new album, the band went on a late 2018 tour with Fit for an Autopsy once again, The Agony Scene and Traitors joined as support.

In early 2019, Unearth co-headlined The "Death to False Metalcore Tour" with Darkest Hour. Misery Signals, Malevolence and Left Behind joined as support on the tour.

Unearth supported Soulfly in the February of 2019 on the West Coast for their Ritual Tour.

Unearth opened up for All That Remains on their Spring Headliner Tour. Big Story and The 9th Planet Out also joined up on the tour.

Unearth opened up for Soulfly once again this year for the "Blood on the Streets" tour. Incite, Prison and Arrival of Autumn were all featured on the lineup.

Unearth than did a co-headlining tour with Darkest Hour in the December of 2019 across the West Coast portion in the United States. Unearth than did a mini east coast run with Gwar as they supported them on their "Use Your Collusion" tour with Savage Master.

Unearth headlined a European tour in the February of 2020 alongside Prong, Dust Bolt and Sinaro.

Unearth was supposed to headline a tour in Australia during the months of April and May that year with The Ascended, but the tour was postponed until further notice due to the COVID-19 Pandemic.

Unearth was one of the bands to open up for Shadows Fall on their reunion show at the Palladium venue in Worcester, Massachusetts, alongside Darkest Hour, Within the Ruins, Sworn Enemy and Carnivora.

On June 2, 2022, the band announced they had parted ways with Nick Pierce and that former drummer Mike Justian had returned to the band. They also announced they were working on a new album.

Unearth opened up for Killswitch Engage on their Holidaze Rager 2 tour in the December of 2022. Rivers of Nihil and Lybica also joined up as supporting acts.

The Wretched; The Ruinous and departure of Ken Susi (2023–present)
In January 2023, Unearth performed several headlining shows all across many different countries like Japan, Australia and Taiwan.

Unearth is set to headline a European tour in April 2023. Misery Index, Year of the Knife, Leach and Turbid North will be joining up as the supporting acts.

On March 3, 2023, the band announced their upcoming eighth album, The Wretched; The Ruinous, would be released on May 5. The band also released a new single from the album, "Mother Betrayal", and also announced they had officially parted ways with Ken Susi after he took an extended hiatus from the band.

Band members

Current members
Trevor Phipps – lead vocals (1998–present)
Buz McGrath – lead guitar (1998–present)
Mike Justian – drums (2002–2007, 2022–present)
Chris O'Toole – bass, backing vocals (2014–present)

Former members
Ken Susi – rhythm guitar (1998–2023)
Mike Rudberg – drums (1998–2002)
Chris "Rover" Rybicki – bass (1998–2001; died 2010)
John "Slo" Maggard – bass, backing vocals (2002–2012)
Derek Kerswill – drums (2007–2010)
Justin Foley – drums (2011–2012)
Nick Pierce – drums (2012–2022)
Matt DeVries – bass, backing vocals (2012–2014)

Current touring members
Peter Layman – rhythm guitar, backing vocals (2005, 2022–present)

Former touring members
Andrew Abramowitz – bass (2001)
Scott McDonald – guitar (2001)
Timmy Thompson – drums (2002)
Tim Mycek – drums (2003)
Adam Dutkiewicz – drums (2003)
Kia Eshghi – lead guitar (2003)
Gene Hoglan – drums (2007)
Mike Martin – lead guitar (2010)
Iano Dovi – bass (2013)
Doc Coyle – bass (2013)
Jordan Mancino – drums (2016–2017)
Mike Schleibaum – rhythm guitar (2019)

Timeline

Discography

The Stings of Conscience (2001)
The Oncoming Storm (2004)
III: In the Eyes of Fire (2006)
The March (2008)
Darkness in the Light (2011)
Watchers of Rule (2014)
Extinction(s) (2018)
The Wretched; The Ruinous (2023)

References

External links

 
  Unearth at eOne Music
 

1998 establishments in Massachusetts
Metalcore musical groups from Massachusetts
Century Media Records artists
Heavy metal musical groups from Massachusetts
Musical groups established in 1998
Musical quintets
Eulogy Recordings artists